Perseigne Abbey is a former Cistercian abbey, formally established in 1145 on land given by William III, Count of Ponthieu, and suppressed in 1791 during the French Revolution. It is located in the north of the Sarthe département near to Neufchâtel-en-Saosnois, on the edge of the Perseigne forest, not far from Alençon.

The ruins, comprising a few stretches of wall, have been listed since 1932 as a monument historique by the French Ministry of Culture.

The abbey was a daughter house of Cîteaux itself; it was of modest importance within the Cistercian Order and founded no daughter houses of its own. Its temporal life was organised in the 12th and 13th centuries around a network of barns that have been discovered by archaeological excavation. Two agricultural buildings have left significant traces.

Intellectual life there flourished particularly in the early days. Between 1165 and 1189, the monk Thomas of Perseigne (also called Thomas le Cistercien) composed his Commentaire du Cantique des Cantiques ("Commentary on the Song of Songs"), which enjoyed great success in the west (there are 87 known copies).

The abbot Adam of Perseigne, author of a vast correspondence, served as the link between the Roman papacy, Cistercian Burgundy and English royalty.

List of abbots (incomplete) 
 Adam: 1188-1221

Notes

References

Sources

External links 
 
 Saosnois.com: Perseigne 
 Abbayes.fr: Perseigne 
  

Buildings and structures in Sarthe
Monuments historiques of Pays de la Loire
Cistercian monasteries in France
Christian monasteries established in the 12th century